Super Speed, SuperSpeed or superspeed may refer to:

 Speedster (fiction), a character whose powers primarily relate to superhuman speed
 SuperSpeed, an advertising tagline of the USB 3.0 interface standard
 Super Speed (film), a 1925 silent comedy film
 Super Speeds, an Indian race car building company
 Superspeedway, a type of automobile racing track
 MS Superspeed 1, a ship